Joaquín Planell Riera (22 November 1891 – 3 July 1969) was a Spanish general who served as Minister of Industry of Spain between 1951 and 1962, during the Francoist dictatorship.

References

1891 births
1969 deaths
Industry ministers of Spain
Government ministers during the Francoist dictatorship